Shahdab Akbar Chowdhury is a Bangladeshi politician and a Jatiya Sangsad member representing the Faridpur-2 constituency at the 2022 by-polls. The seat became vacant when then incumbent, Syeda Sajeda Chowdhury, also his mother, died in office on 11 September 2022.

Background
Shahdab was born to Golam Akbar Chowdhury (d. 2015) and Syeda Sajeda Chowdhury (d. 2022).

Political career
At the bypoll election held on 5 November 2022, Chowdhury received 68,812 votes out of the 83,690, while his only opponent, Zainul Abedin Bakul Miah of Bangladesh Khilafat Andolan got 14,878.

References

Living people
Awami League politicians
11th Jatiya Sangsad members
Place of birth missing (living people)
Date of birth missing (living people)
Year of birth missing (living people)